Lee Seung-yeon (born January 21, 1977) is a South Korean actress.

Filmography

Film

Television

Theater

References

External links
 
 
 

1977 births
Living people
21st-century South Korean actresses
South Korean film actresses
South Korean television actresses
South Korean stage actresses